Park Jin-young (Hangul: 박진영; born December 13, 1971), also known by his stage names J. Y. Park and The Asiansoul or the initials JYP, is a South Korean singer-songwriter, record producer, record executive, and reality television show judge. Park rose to stardom as a singer following the release of his 1994 debut album, Blue City. In 1997, he became the founder of JYP Entertainment, one of the most profitable entertainment agencies in South Korea. As the former head of JYP Entertainment (May 1997–Feb 2011), Park has developed and managed highly successful K-pop artists including Rain, Wonder Girls, 2PM, Miss A, Got7, Day6, Twice, Stray Kids, Itzy, Xdinary Heroes and Nmixx, as well as Mandopop group Boy Story and J-pop group NiziU.

Early life and education 
Park was born in Seoul. His father was a news correspondent based in the U.S. At age 9, Park moved with his mother to New York following his father's reassignment. They lived there for three years before Park returned to Seoul for high school. He later attended Yonsei University, during which time he released his first two albums. He graduated with a bachelor's in geology in 1996. He has an older sister.

Career 
Park originally debuted as the trio boy group "Park Jin Young and the NG(New Generation)(박진영과 신세대)", with Kim Soo-chul as a producer, and members Cho Hye-sung and Yoon Tae-jin. Their first album 'Floating time(떠도는 시간)' was not successful.Park's notability within the Korean music industry began in 1994 when he debuted as a solo artist with the song "Don't Leave Me" (날 떠나지마) from his debut album Blue City. During this period, he met composer and long-time collaborator Bang Si-hyuk. In 1997, Park founded his label and agency JYP Entertainment, then known as Tae-Hong Planning Corp(대홍기획). That same year, he was tasked by EBM (now SidusHQ) with preparing the members of its project group for debut; the five-member act was eventually called g.o.d and debuted two years later. The success of g.o.d as one of the country's most popular and bestselling groups of the early 2000s would further establish Bang and Park's reputation as hit makers.

In 2004, Park ventured into the American music industry, becoming the first Asian producer to cross over to the U.S., producing music for Will Smith, Mase and Cassie.

In May 2008, Park collaborated with Jackie Chan to form the I Love Asia Project, prompted by the earthquake tragedy in China. Park produced the song "Smile Again" along with Chan and Korean director Kang Je-gyu to raise funds for relief efforts in Sichuan. The song featured an array of Korean stars including actors and singers as well as figure skater Kim Yuna. The music video was released on JYP Entertainment's YouTube channel on June 30.

In October 2009, Park became the first Korean songwriter, together with RAINSTONE, to reach the Billboard Hot 100 Chart with the Wonder Girls hit "Nobody" which debuted at No. 76.

On December 3, 2009, Park released his single "No Love No More". On April 22, 2011, Park collaborated with Brown Eyed Girls' Ga-In, releasing the duet track "Someone Else". The song charted at No. 2 on the Gaon Digital Chart and sold over a million copies. This was his first release in about two years. Park followed up his success with "Someone Else" by releasing the single "You're the One" on April 28, 2012. The song rose to No. 3 and sold over 1.5 million copies.

In 2015, Park released the song "Who's Your Mama?" featuring Lucky J's Jessi. The song became a hit, displacing fellow label-mates Miss A from first spot on the Korean charts. Later that year, he participated in the Infinite Challenge Yeongdong Expressway Music Festival, forming the duo Dancing Genome with comedian Yoo Jae-suk and releasing the song "I'm So Sexy".

In 2016, Park released a single titled 'Still Alive'. During the same period, he appeared in the Conan O'Brien special 'Conan in Korea', recording a song with Conan O'Brien, Steven Yeun & Park Ji-min titled 'Fire', with label-mates Wonder Girls and Twice appearing in the music video. The song was released on Conan O'Brien's YouTube channel on April 9. Park also appeared in the Korean variety show Sister's Slam Dunk in 2016, producing the cast's single titled 'Shut Up'. The song unexpectedly achieved a real-time chart all-kill upon release. On September 22, 2016, it was reported that Park would be producing the title track of girl-group I.O.I for their final album prior to disbandment. The song, titled "Very Very Very" was released on October 16, 2016. It achieved commercial success upon release, earning a perfect all-kill on the Korean charts and topping the Gaon Digital Chart.
In 2019, Park released a song titled 'Fever' featured by Superbee and BIBI.

On August 11, 2020, Park released his autobiography, Live for What? One day later, Park released a new single, "When We Disco", which was a duet with Sunmi. This was his first collaboration with Sunmi since her departure from JYP Entertainment and the Wonder Girls. The single peaked at #3 at the Gaon Digital Chart, becoming his sixth Top 10 song in the chart.

On April 26, 2021, it was reported that Park and Psy, the founder of P Nation, will collaborate to form a new boy group each in Loud, which premiered on June 5, 2021 on SBS.

In November 2022, Park released the single "Groove Back", which was released on November 21, but the music video was released three days prior, according to the agency.later Park confirmed to hold a solo concert, In Japan for the first time in 7 years at Yokohama Pia Arena MM, January 28-29, 2023.

Acting 
In early 2011, JYP made his acting debut in Dream High, for which he received a nomination for New Actor of the Year at the Baeksang Arts Awards. In January 2012 he was seen in the sequel to Dream High called Dream High 2.

In 2011, Park made his film debut as Choi Young In, a man on a mission to hand-deliver 5 million dollars, in Five Million Dollar Man with Jo Sung-ha and Min Hyo-rin. The film was released on July 19, 2012.

Lawsuit
On February 10, 2011, songwriter Kim Sin-il filed a lawsuit against Park claiming that "Someday", sung by IU and composed by Park, plagiarized Kim's song "To My Man". Kim alleged that the beginnings of the two songs, including the jazz chords, are almost identical and sued Park for 110 million won. Park denied the allegations, and no settlement was reached after several court hearings. On February 10, 2012, the Seoul Central District Court ruled that "Someday" was plagiarized from Kim's song, and ordered Park to pay 21.67 million won in damages to Kim. Park appealed the ruling, but on January 24, 2013, the Seoul High Court ruled against Park and ordered him to pay 56.93 million won to Kim.
In 2015, the Supreme Court overturned the previous rulings in light of new evidence demonstrating that the melody and chord progressions were very common, specifically citing Kirk Franklin's 2002 song "Hosanna".

Personal life 
In 1999, Park Jin-young married Seo Yoon-jeong. In March 2009, the couple announced their divorce. On October 10, 2013, he married a woman nine years younger than him. On January 25, 2019, his daughter was born, and Park wrote "This Small Hand" for her and his father, with a documentary-style music video released on February 9. In the music video, it was revealed that his father was in the late stage of Alzheimer's disease and could no longer recognize him. All proceeds from the song went to the Green Umbrella Foundation (ChildFund Korea) to help children in need.

Park is a born-again Christian and leads weekly Bible practices. Park turned to several faiths to fill the "void in [his] heart" after his divorce before finding his faith in Christianity.

Philanthropy 
In December 2022, Park donated 500 million won to Samsung Seoul Hospital and World Vision, an international relief and development NGO (NGO) on the 9th.

Discography

Studio albums

Compilation albums

Extended plays

Single albums

Singles

Soundtrack appearances

Lyrics and composition

Filmography

Film

Television series

Variety and reality shows

Awards

State honors

Listicles

Notes

References

External links 

 Official website

1971 births
Living people
A&R people
English-language singers from South Korea
JYP Entertainment artists
K-pop singers
Melon Music Award winners
MAMA Award winners
Musicians from Seoul
South Korean chief executives
South Korean Christians
South Korean dance musicians
South Korean male dancers
South Korean male film actors
South Korean male pop singers
South Korean male singer-songwriters
South Korean male television actors
South Korean music industry executives
South Korean music managers
South Korean record producers
South Korean television producers
Yonsei University alumni
20th-century South Korean male singers
21st-century South Korean male singers